The Bihar women's cricket team is a women's cricket team that represents the Indian state of Bihar. The team competes in the Women's Senior One Day Trophy and the Women's Senior T20 Trophy.

See also
Bihar cricket team

References

Women's cricket teams in India
Cricket in Bihar